A leadership election was held by the Israeli Labor Party on 12 June 2007, to elect the party's new leader, due to internal dissatisfaction with the incumbent chairman Amir Peretz. The winner was Ehud Barak.

History 
Five candidates ran in the election: Ehud Barak attempted to return to politics, this time after the move of Shimon Peres to Kadima, while Ami Ayalon announced his ambition to become prime minister.

Ofir Pines-Paz had been chairman of the coalition in the Fifteenth Knesset. He was the party's secretary-general in 2001-2003. In the 2006 election he was third in the Labor-Meimad list, after Peretz and Isaac Herzog. When Yisrael Beiteinu joined the coalition and Avigdor Lieberman was appointed minister, Pines-Paz resigned from the government. His resignation took effect on 1 November 2006. Danny Yatom ran in the election but came last in the first round of voting.

The election consisted of two rounds, the first of which took place on 28 May 2007.  Ehud Barak won a slim victory in the party primary, beating Ayalon, former head of the Shin Bet domestic security service. Both candidates polled well ahead of Peretz, but neither gained the requisite 40-percent margin of victory for an outright win. Peretz, then the Incumbent leader of the party, came third and did not advance to the second round. he subsequently endorsed Ayalon, while Pines-Paz endorsed Barak. Barak won the second round with 51.3% of the vote to Ayalon's 47.7%, with 1% of voters abstaining.

Opinion polls

First round

Second round

Results 
In the first round, Ayalon won a plurality of votes in the Kibbutzim, while Peretz won a plurality of Arab Voters.

References

External links
Labor Party Primary Election (Israel Democracy Institute)

Labor Party leadership election
Israeli Labor Party leadership elections
Israeli Labor Party leadership election
Israeli Labor Party leadership election